Stanisław Rospond (December 19, 1906 – October 16, 1982) was a Polish linguist, and professor at the University of Wroclaw.

References
 Jan Miodek, Stanisław Rospond, [w:] Odpowiednie dać rzeczy słowo, Wrocław 1987 (za ).
 Bogdan Siciński, Stanisław Rospond, [w:] Uczeni wrocławscy, Wrocław (za ).

1906 births
1982 deaths
Writers from Kraków
Linguists from Poland
Polish lexicographers
20th-century linguists
Academic staff of the University of Wrocław
20th-century lexicographers